The Witch Mountain franchise consists of American science fiction fantasy-action adventure films, produced by The Walt Disney Company. Based on the 1968 novel Escape to Witch Mountain by Alexander Key, the films deal with extraterrestrial children on Earth seeking to return to their home planet, while antagonists attempt to foil their escape. The franchise includes both theatrical and made-for-television releases.

The films overall were met with mixed critical and audience response, though conversely they have turned a profit for The Walt Disney Company. The franchise will continue with a reboot television series in development, to be released as a Disney+ exclusive.

Origin

Novels 
The Walt Disney Company's Witch Mountain franchise is based on the 1968 science fiction novel Escape to Witch Mountain, written by Alexander Key. The events of the story follow two teenage orphans named Tony and Tia, who have paranormal abilities. The pair, who have little recollection of their past, are placed into a juvenile detention home by social services. After being released to a man self-described to be their "uncle", they discover his nefarious plans in using them for personal gain. Over the events of the book, the two remember their true nature as extraterrestrial life who came to Earth, when their home-planet was being destroyed. The duo escape with the remainder of their people, who call themselves "Castaways".

A sequel novel titled Return from Witch Mountain was released in 1978 by the Walt Disney Studios, to coincide with the release of their feature film of the same title. Key penned the novelization, based on the screenplay by Malcolm Marmorstein. It was originally published in 1978 by the Westminster Press in Philadelphia, Pennsylvania.

Development 
The Walt Disney Company released a 1975 feature film adaptation that was mostly faithful to the source material. The movie was one of the studio's most successful live-action films at the time. Following the positive response to the film, the franchise continued with later installments.

Films

Escape to Witch Mountain (1975) 

Two teenage orphaned siblings, Tony and Tia Malone, secretly possess psychic powers. When those abilities attract attention from a villainous billionaire named Aristotle Bolt, the pair find themselves on the run. Bolt kidnaps them with plans to exploit their powers for his personal financial gain. Tony and Tia escape his containment, and with the help of a bitter widower named Jason O'Day they avoid Bolt's nefarious plans, and discover their other worldly origins.

Return from Witch Mountain (1978) 

After previously escaping the greedy and scheming humans of Earth, Tony and Tia return for a vacation. While on their Earth-bound getaway, the pair attract the attention of another treacherous man. Doctor Gannon, and his henchwoman named Letha, see the pair's abilities as an avenue in attaining riches. The villainous duo kidnap Tony, and use his power to sway Tia. She follows and pursues them, with a plan to free her brother.

Beyond Witch Mountain (1982) 

A third installment was released exclusively through television broadcast in the early-'80s, beginning a decade-long trend of made-for-television sequels to, and remakes of, classic Walt Disney productions.

When reports of a boy's inexplicable abilities arise, Tony and Tia return to Earth. Knowing that the young boy must be from their world, the pair are sent to find the child. In their task, they are joined by Jason O'Day, their old friend. Together they race to find the boy, before a familiar nemesis (Aristotle Bolt) does.

Disney's Escape to Witch Mountain (1995) 

Disney produced a remake of Escape to Witch Mountain for broadcast on The Magical World of Disney in 1995. Marketed as a remake of the original 1975 film, the story shares commonalities with the previous adaptation.

A pair of twin humanoid-alien babies are found near a mysterious mountain. Unintentionally separated, they grow in age unknowingly within the same town. Without knowledge of the other's existence, the pair eventually meet and learn that they both possess supernatural abilities. Upon discovering each other, a questionable local businessman decides to use the teenagers powers to make himself rich. On the run from these nefarious plans and with the support of other-worldly alliances, only the strange place known as Witch Mountain can save them.

Race to Witch Mountain (2009) 

Initially marketed as a remake or reboot, the theatrical film was revealed to be a legacy sequel over the course of events of its story. 

The plot tells the events surrounding a pair of extraterrestrial teenagers named Sara and Seth who have paranormal abilities, are in search of a way back to their home-planet, and drag a Las Vegas taxi driver named Jack Bruno into their adventures. Before an invasion from other worlds comes to Earth, the teens must find the location of their spaceship, which is buried within Witch Mountain. Bruno finds himself aiding the youth while evading government operatives and an alien bounty hunter/assassin who are fast on their trail.

Television 
In April 2019, a television series in the franchise was announced to be in development as a streaming exclusive release for Disney+.

By March 2021, the series had been green-lit for a pilot. The series is co-written by Terry Matalas and Travis Fickett, while John Davis and John Fox are serving as producers. The series is a joint-venture production between Disney Platform Distribution and Davis Entertainment. Simply titled Witch Mountain, it is a reimagining of the original film. With the premise based on the first film, the cast was announced with Bryce Dallas Howard, Isabel Gravitt, Levi Miller, Bianca "b" Norwood, and Jackson Kelly.

Main cast and characters

Additional crew and production details

Reception

Box office and financial performance

Critical and public response

Notes

References 

Mass media franchises introduced in 1968
Film series introduced in 1975
 
Disney film series
Fictional places in Disney films